The 2014–15 Liga de Nuevos Talentos season was split in two tournaments Apertura and Clausura. Liga de Nuevos Talentos was the fourth–tier football league of Mexico. The season was played between 22 August 2014 and 10 May 2015.

Torneo Apertura

Changes from the previous season 
Titanes de Tulancingo changed its name to Alto Rendimiento Tuzo.
Real Zamora was promoted from Third Division.
Sahuayo F.C. arrived as an expansion team.
Promesas Altamira and Santos Los Mochis disappeared.

Stadiums and locations

Group 1

Group 2

Regular season

Group 1

Standings

Results

Group 2

Standings

Results

Regular-season statistics

Top goalscorers 
Players sorted first by goals scored, then by last name.

Source: Liga Premier

Liguilla

Liguilla de Ascenso (Promotion Playoffs) 
The four best teams of each group play two games against each other on a home-and-away basis. The higher seeded teams play on their home field during the second leg. The winner of each match up is determined by aggregate score. In the quarterfinals and semifinals, if the two teams are tied on aggregate the higher seeded team advances. In the final, if the two teams are tied after both legs, the match goes to extra time and, if necessary, a penalty shoot-out.

Quarter-finals

First leg

Second leg

Semi-finals

First leg

Second leg

Final

First leg

Second leg

Liguilla de Copa

Torneo Clausura

Group 1

Standings

Results

Group 2

Standings

Results

Regular-season statistics

Top goalscorers 
Players sorted first by goals scored, then by last name.

Source: Liga Premier

Liguilla

Liguilla de Liga 
The four best teams of each group play two games against each other on a home-and-away basis. The higher seeded teams play on their home field during the second leg. The winner of each match up is determined by aggregate score. In the quarterfinals and semifinals, if the two teams are tied on aggregate the higher seeded team advances. In the final, if the two teams are tied after both legs, the match goes to extra time and, if necessary, a penalty shoot-out.

(*) The team was classified by its position in the season table

Quarter-finals

First leg

Second leg

Semi-finals

First leg

Second leg

Final

First leg

Second leg

Liguilla de Copa

Relegation Table 

Last updated: 12 April 2015 Source: Liga Premier FMFP = Position; G = Games played; Pts = Points; Pts/G = Ratio of points to games played

Due to changes in the number of participants in the league, the relegation was canceled this season.

Promotion Final
The Promotion Final is a series of matches played by the champions of the tournaments Apertura and Clausura, the game was played to determine the winning team of the promotion to Liga Premier de Ascenso. 
The first leg was played on 7 May 2015, and the second leg was played on 10 May 2015.

First leg

Second leg

See also 
2014–15 Liga MX season
2014–15 Ascenso MX season
2014–15 Liga Premier de Ascenso season

References

External links 
 Official website of Liga Premier
 Magazine page 

 
1